Czarina Mae Arevalo (born 14 May 1985) is a Filipino former professional tennis player.

Born in Ilocos Norte, Arevalo competed for the Philippines Fed Cup team from 2000 to 2008, appearing in a record 32 ties. She won 14 singles and 11 doubles rubbers during her Fed Cup career.

Arevalo represented her country at the 2003 Afro-Asian Games, 2006 Asian Games and in multiple editions of the Southeast Asian Games. She was a five-time Southeast Asian Games medalist.

ITF finals

Singles: 1 (0–1)

Doubles: 2 (0–2)

References

External links
 
 
 

1985 births
Living people
Filipino female tennis players
Sportspeople from Ilocos Norte
Tennis players at the 2006 Asian Games
Asian Games competitors for the Philippines
Southeast Asian Games medalists in tennis
Southeast Asian Games silver medalists for the Philippines
Southeast Asian Games bronze medalists for the Philippines
Competitors at the 1999 Southeast Asian Games
Competitors at the 2001 Southeast Asian Games
Competitors at the 2003 Southeast Asian Games
Competitors at the 2005 Southeast Asian Games
Competitors at the 2007 Southeast Asian Games